The 1939 season was Wisła Krakóws 31st year as a club.

Friendlies

Ekstraklasa

The championship was unfinished because of the Nazi German attack on Poland which triggered the Second World War.

Squad, appearances and goals

|-
|}

Goalscorers

Disciplinary record

External links
1939 Wisła Kraków season at historiawisly.pl

Wisła Kraków seasons
Association football clubs 1939 season
Wisla